Saugerties can refer to the following places in Ulster County, New York:

 Saugerties (town), New York
 Saugerties (village), New York